Alexander Nevsky Cathedral is the  Eastern Orthodox Cathedral in Novosibirsk, Russia, named in honor of Saint Alexander Nevsky.

It is one of the first stone constructions in Novonikolayevsk (former name of Novosibirsk). The church was built in Neo-Byzantine architectural style in 1896–1899. The building design was influenced by the design of Church of Our Lady the Merciful in St.Petersburg built a few years earlier.

It was opened and consecrated on December 29, 1899. In 1915 it became a cathedral.

The cathedral was a specific monument to Tsar Alexander III who initiated construction of the Trans-Siberian Railway which resulted in the foundation of Novonikolayevsk (now Novosibirsk)  as a new railway station.

In 1937, the cathedral was closed by Soviet authorities.

In 1988, the year of the 1000th anniversary of Kievan Rus' conversion to Christianity, a movement began for the restitution of the cathedral. In 1989, it was re-opened.

See also
Neo-Byzantine architecture in the Russian Empire
Alexander Nevsky Cathedral - other cathedrals of the same name

References

External links

Official website
 Людмила Кузменкина. 110 лет назад в Новониколаевском заложили Александро-Невский собор. Вечерний Новосибирск, 12.05.2007 

Byzantine Revival architecture in Russia
Churches in Siberia
Russian Orthodox cathedrals in Russia
Churches in Novosibirsk
Tourist attractions in Novosibirsk
Novosibirsk
Tsentralny City District, Novosibirsk
Church buildings with domes
Churches completed in 1899
1899 establishments in the Russian Empire
Cultural heritage monuments of regional significance in Novosibirsk Oblast